Dorstenia aristeguietae is a plant species in the family Moraceae which is native to Venezuela.

References

aristeguietae
Plants described in 1954
Flora of Venezuela